Donald Francis O'Hara (born 15 February 1933) is a former Australian rules footballer who played with Geelong in the Victorian Football League (VFL).

Notes

External links 

Living people
1933 births
Australian rules footballers from Victoria (Australia)
Geelong Football Club players
North Geelong Football Club players